Pennsylvania is a state in the United States.

Pennsylvania may also refer to:

Places 
 Province of Pennsylvania, before independence in 1776
 Pennsylvania, Alabama, an unincorporated community in the United States
 Pennsylvania Avenue, in Washington, D.C. where the White House is located
 For others, see Pennsylvania Avenue (disambiguation)
 Pennsylvania, Exeter, a suburb of Exeter, Devon, England
 Pennsylvania, Gloucestershire, a village in England
 University of Pennsylvania, an Ivy League university located in Philadelphia, Pennsylvania

Land transport 
 Pennsylvania Railroad, United States, 1846–1968
 Pennsylvania Station, any of several Pennsylvania Railroad terminals
 6-4-4-6, a wheel arrangement for duplex steam locomotives in the Whyte notation, was nicknamed "Pennsylvania"

Ships 
SS Pennsylvania, a name carried by several merchant and passenger ships
USS Pennsylvania, ships of the United States Navy which have borne the name
Pennsylvania (steamboat), a Mississippi steamboat that exploded and sank on June 13, 1858

Music 
 Pennsylvania (album) (1998), by Pere Ubu
 "Pennsylvania" (song), the official state song
 "Pennsylvania", a song by the Bloodhound Gang from the 2005 album Hefty Fine
 "Pennsylvania", a song by Jars of Clay from the 2013 album Inland

Other 
 The Pennsylvania, a historic apartment building in Indianapolis, Indiana, U.S.
 Pennsylvania Grade Crude Oil, a type of crude oil first discovered in Pennsylvania

See also 
 "Pennsylvania 6-5000" (song), a 1940 swing jazz and pop standard
 
 Pennsylvanian (disambiguation)